Evius lobata is a moth of the family Erebidae. It was described by Paul Dognin in 1911. It is found in Colombia and French Guiana.

References

 

Phaegopterina
Moths described in 1911